David Chandler "Dave" Lyons (born January 23, 1943) is an American former competition swimmer and Pan American Games gold medalist.

Lyons earned a gold medal as a member of the first-place U.S. team in the men's 4×200-meter freestyle relay at the 1963 Pan American Games.  At the 1964 Summer Olympics in Tokyo, he swam for the gold medal-winning U.S. team in the preliminary heats of the men's 4×200-meter freestyle relay.  Under the 1964 Olympic rules he was ineligible to receive a medal, however, because he did swim in the event final.

Lyons began his competitive swimming at New Trier High School, Winnetka, Illinois.  He was part of the high school national championship team in 1961.  The team later placed third in the 1961 AAU championships.  In 1961, he was the second swimmer to go under 1:50 for the 200-yard freestyle, Steve Clark of Yale doing it one day earlier.  Lyons attended Yale University, where he swam for coach Phil Moriarty's Yale Bulldogs swimming and diving team in National Collegiate Athletic Association (NCAA) competition from 1963 to 1965.  He won three consecutive NCAA national championships as a member of winning Yale teams in the 400-yard freestyle relay.

Lyons later earned both M.B.A. and M.D. degrees.

See also
 List of Yale University people
 World record progression 4 × 200 metres freestyle relay

References

1943 births
Living people
American male freestyle swimmers
Olympic swimmers of the United States
Swimmers from Chicago
Swimmers at the 1963 Pan American Games
Swimmers at the 1964 Summer Olympics
Yale Bulldogs men's swimmers
Pan American Games gold medalists for the United States
Pan American Games medalists in swimming
Medalists at the 1963 Pan American Games